New Zealand competed at the 1980 Winter Olympics in Lake Placid, United States.

Alpine skiing

Men

Women

See also
 New Zealand at the 1980 Winter Paralympics

References
Official Olympic Reports (PDF format)
 Olympic Winter Games 1980, full results by sports-reference.com

Nations at the 1980 Winter Olympics
1980
Winter Olympics